Paris type is a pattern of mycorrhizal infection which is coil-like in morphology.

These have direct intracellular growth to new cells.
The mycoheterotrophic plants use this to their advantage, as well as in many tree species, such as acer.

See also
Arbuscular mycorrhizal fungi
Arum type

References
C.J. Alexopolous, Charles W. Mims, M. Blackwell  et al., Introductory Mycology, 4th ed. (John Wiley and Sons, Hoboken NJ, 2004)  

Fungal morphology and anatomy